ConnMan is an internet connection manager for embedded devices running the Linux operating system.

The Connection Manager is designed to be slim and to use as few resources as possible, so it can be easily integrated. It is a fully modular system that can be extended, through plug-ins, to support all kinds of wired or wireless technologies. Also, configuration methods, like DHCP and domain name resolving, are implemented using plug-ins. The plug-in approach allows for easy adaption and modification for various use cases.

Originally created as part of Intel's Moblin effort, it's now used by OpenELEC as well as Mer and therefore also Sailfish OS by Jolla, which is based on it.

See also 
 NetworkManager
 netifd
 Wicd

References

External links 
 Connection Manager comparison (NetworkManager, ConnMan, VMC, Wicd)

Applications using D-Bus
Free network-related software
Linux network-related software